Marisa Pires Nogueira (born 10 August 1966), commonly known as Marisa, is a Brazilian footballer who played as a defender for the Brazil women's national football team.

Marisa was named in the EC Radar club team who represented Brazil at the 1988 FIFA Women's Invitation Tournament in Guangdong and finished in third place.

In the 1991 FIFA Women's World Cup, team captain Marisa started all three group games as Brazil were eliminated in the first round. She remained in the national squad for the next campaign at the 1995 South American Women's Football Championship, but was not included in the squad for the 1995 FIFA Women's World Cup. In 1997 Marisa was playing for São Paulo FC.

Marisa was named in the 30–player pre–selection for the 1999 FIFA Women's World Cup, and retained her place in the 20 for the final tournament.

In 2007 Marisa was the coach of Vasco da Gama's female section. In July 2012 she was playing in a local futsal league.

References

External links
 
Saad EC profile

1966 births
Living people
Olympic footballers of Brazil
Footballers at the 1996 Summer Olympics
Footballers at the 2000 Summer Olympics
1999 FIFA Women's World Cup players
1991 FIFA Women's World Cup players
Brazil women's international footballers
Brazilian women's footballers
EC Radar players
Saad Esporte Clube (women) players
Women's association football defenders
São Paulo FC (women) players
Footballers from Rio de Janeiro (city)